Malaysian Super Six Schools Rugby is an annual rugby union league that is held to crown the best school rugby team in Malaysia. The league were invitational, with all the six schools had a sterling record in the various schools rugby competitions. It were the richest rugby competitions in Malaysia.

Format
All the teams were invited. The league start with round-robin game were held first before a final, contested by the top two teams of the league. The winner of the final will win the Yahaya Ahmad Cup. Since 2016, the cup is known as Malaysia Airports Chairman’s Challenge Trophy. For 2017, the top three teams from the Super Six league and the Ragbi Perdana (Ansara Alumni League U17) league champion will qualify for the four spots in the Malaysia Airports Chairman’s Challenge Trophy.

Core Teams

Malaysian Super Six Schools Rugby Finals

See also

 Rugby League World Cup
 Women's Rugby World Cup
 Rugby World Cup Overall Record

References

Rugby union competitions in Malaysia